1910 was the 21st season of County Championship cricket in England. Kent won a second successive title. Norfolk won the Minor Counties Championship, defeating Berkshire in the final challenge match. There were no overseas tours to England during the season, the English team having toured South Africa over the 1909–10 winter. A tour to the West Indies also took place over the 1910–11 winter.

Honours
1910 County Championship - Kent
Minor Counties Championship - Norfolk
Wisden Cricketers of the Year - Harry Foster, Alfred Hartley, Charles Llewellyn, Razor Smith, Frank Woolley

1910 County Championship

The County Championship was won by Kent, recording their second successive victory following their Championship win in 1909. Surrey finished in second place. Somerset finished last without winning a first-class match all season.

Statistics
Johnny Tyldesley topped the batting averages with 2265 runs scored at an average of 46.22.  J T Hearne topped the bowling averages with 119 wickets at an average of 12.79.

Annual reviews
 Wisden Cricketers' Almanack 1911

See also
 1910 County Championship
 Derbyshire County Cricket Club in 1910
 Kent County Cricket Club in 1910

References

External links
 CricketArchive – season summaries

1910 in English cricket
English cricket seasons in the 20th century